Alexander "Sandy" Whistler Street,  is an Australian federal judge and naval commander, and a scion of the Street family. His father Sir Laurence Whistler Street, grandfather Sir Kenneth Whistler Street and great-grandfather Sir Philip Whistler Street each served as Chief Justice of the Supreme Court of New South Wales and Lieutenant-Governor of New South Wales. His sister Sylvia and brother-in-law Arthur Emmett also served as federal judges.

Family

Street was born in Sydney to Commander Sir Laurence Whistler Street and Susan Gai (née Watt), formerly Lady Street, the first female chair of the Eastern Sydney Health Service. His grandmother Lady "Red Jessie" Street was Australia's first female delegate to the United Nations. He descends from the Australian politicians John Street, John Watt, George Holden, Edward Ogilvie and William Lawson. His sister, Sylvia Emmett (née Street), is a former federal judge and reserve naval commander. His brother-in-law, Arthur Emmett, is a former federal judge and Challis Lecturer in Roman Law at Sydney Law School. His other siblings by Sir Laurence's first marriage are Kenneth Street, a businessman, and Sarah Farley (née Street), a businesswoman. His half-sister by Sir Laurence's second marriage to Penelope (née Ferguson), Lady Street, is Jessie Street, a lawyer. He has four children: Charles Street, a barrister; Jack Street, a lawyer; Lucy Street and Heidi Street.

Career

In January 2015, Street was appointed to the Federal Circuit Court of Australia, now the Federal Circuit and Family Court of Australia, by the Attorney-General George Brandis. One of Judge Street's rulings was overturned by the full Federal Court on appeal after he dismissed a cerebral palsy sufferer's claim of discrimination and pursuit of damages against Virgin Australia for refusing to allow his guide dog on a flight. In late 2015, statistics were filed in court which revealed Judge Street had heard 254 migration appeals between January and June 2015, and had found in favour of the immigration minister in 252 cases. In that same period, Judge Street disposed of 286 cases while his 8 judicial colleagues disposed of a combined 357 cases. Judge Street was accused of lacking procedural fairness and over 70 of his rulings were overturned in five years. In a case report from September 2018, he was found by the full Federal Court to have dismissed an Afghan asylum seeker's case without sufficient reasoning. In another case report from 2019, he took 75 days to provide written reasoning for his dismissal of an Iranian asylum seeker's application to review a visa rejection, when the litigant had only 21 days to appeal.

References

Australian Senior Counsel
Year of birth missing (living people)
Living people
21st-century Australian judges
Sandy
Judges of the Federal Circuit Court of Australia